Carmen Belén Richardson (September 14, 1930 − August 9, 2012) was a  Puerto Rican actress and comedian.

Early years 
Richardson was born in Santurce. Her parents felt that she had a special talent for acting at an early age and in 1939 when she was nine years old they had her audition for a child's role in a radio soap opera on the WNEL Radio Station. The people at the station were so impressed with her that they hired her on the spot. She attended the Central High School of Santurce where she actively participated in her school plays. On one occasion when she was 14 years old, Juan Ramón Jiménez, the Spanish Nobel Prize winner, was present for one of her presentations. He was impressed by what he saw to the point that he offered to pay Richardson's university tuition.

Puerto Rican television pioneer 
Richardson enrolled at the University of Puerto Rico where she studied Dramatic Arts. In 1954, after she graduated, Puerto Rican television pioneer and producer Tommy Muñiz, offered her a role in his new program El Colegio de la Alegria. She played the part of "Lirio Blanco", a funny, extremely tall girl who could open her eyes in amazement extremely wide. Thus, Richardson became the second black Puerto Rican actress in Puerto Rico's television industry, after Rita Delgado, in 1955. She was also to act as a comedian in other television shows such as La Criada Malcriada in the role of Jazmín, Hogar Dulce Hogar as María Antonieta de los Ángeles Monroig López and in Esto No Tiene Nombre. In Esto No Tiene Nombre, she made comical imitations of many personalities. Among those who she imitated were Angela Davis and Roberta Flack.

Actors labor dispute 
During the 1970s, Richardson worked in comedies Black Power and Ja, ja, ji, ji, jo, jo con Agrelot alongside comedian José Miguel Agrelot. During that decade Puerto Rico witnessed one of the largest labor disputes between the Actors Union and Tommy Muñiz Productions. The lack of work forced Richardson to leave Tommy Muñiz Productions. She then joined and worked for ASTRA Productions. With ASTRA Productions Richardson found work in the televised programs Ahí va eso and Sin ton ni son.

A new opportunity, outside of comedy, presented itself when the local television stations once again began to produce soap operas. Among the soap operas in which she participated are:
 Anacaona as Belén,
 El Idolo as Caridad Carvajal,
 Rojo Verano as Sor Teresa and
 Marta Llorens as Mamá Luz.

Mexican soap operas 
In 1980, Richardson went to Mexico and was hired by Chilean director Valentin Pimstein, to work in soap operas. During the three years that she spent in Mexico, she acted in:
 El Maleficio (1983),
 Guadalupe (1984) as Dominga,
 Soledad (1981),
 Amalia Batista (1983) and
 El Hogar que yo Robe (1981) as Fernanda, alongside Mexican actors Juan Ferrara and Angélica María.

Theater 
Richardson returned to Puerto Rico and in 1985 went to work in local theater productions. She took part in Cecilia Valdes, Clemente (the musical), Cuando él es Guadalupe, Flor de Pesidio and Sirena.

The 1989 Festival of Art "El Cemi" in Puerto Rico was dedicated to her and in recognition of her 40 years in the world of entertainment she was awarded the Carlos Busquets award. Richardson joined Producciones MECA, founded by actresses Camille Carrion and Ángela Meyer. With this new company she actively participated in the following shows and soap operas, Ellas al Mediodia, Ave de Paso (1988), La Isla and Yara Prohibida (1988). Richardson imitated American actress and comedian Whoopi Goldberg in the theatre presentation of Múltiples ellas.

Later years 
Carmen Belén Richardson retired from acting after being diagnosed with fibromyalgia. She founded a fibromyalgia support group in Puerto Rico called "Fundación Carmen Belén Richardson". Richardson died on August 9, 2012, at HIMA hospital in Caguas, Puerto Rico at the age of 81. She was buried at Borinquen Memorial Park in Carolina, Puerto Rico. Richardson had two biological daughters: Migbel and Eda; and an adoptive daughter: Waleska.

See also 

List of Puerto Ricans
List of Puerto Ricans of African descent
History of women in Puerto Rico

References

External links
 
 Popular Culture

1930 births
2012 deaths
People from Santurce, Puerto Rico
Puerto Rican comedians
20th-century Puerto Rican actresses